Jan Czochralski (23 October 1885 – 22 April 1953) was a Polish chemist who invented the Czochralski method, which is used for growing single crystals and in the production of semiconductor wafers. It is still used in over 90 percent of all electronics in the world that use semiconductors. He is the most cited Polish scholar.

Life and career

Czochralski was born in what was then Exin in the Prussian Province of Posen, German Empire (now Kcynia, Poland). Around 1900 he moved to Berlin, where he worked at a pharmacy. He was educated at Charlottenburg Polytechnic in Berlin, where he specialized in metal chemistry. Czochralski began working as an engineer for Allgemeine Elektrizitäts Gesellschaft (AEG) in 1907.

He discovered the Czochralski method in 1916, when he accidentally dipped his pen into a crucible of molten tin rather than his inkwell. He immediately pulled his pen out to discover that a thin thread of solidified metal was hanging from the nib. The nib was replaced by a capillary, and Czochralski verified that the crystallized metal was a single crystal. Czochralski's experiments produced single crystals a millimeter in diameter and up to 150 centimeters long. He published a paper on his discovery in 1918 in the Zeitschrift für Physikalische Chemie, a German chemistry journal, under the title "Ein neues Verfahren zur Messung der Kristallisationsgeschwindigkeit der Metalle" [A new method for the measurement of the crystallization rate of metals], since the method was at that time used for measuring the crystallization rate of metals such as tin, zinc and lead. In 1948, Americans Gordon K. Teal and J.B. Little from Bell Labs would use the method to grow single germanium crystals, leading to its use in semiconductor production.

In 1917, Czochralski organized the research laboratory "Metallbank und Metallurgische Gesellschaft", which he directed until 1928. In 1919 he was one of the founding members of the German Society for Metals Science (Deutsche Gesellschaft für Metallkunde), of which he was president until 1925. In 1928, at the request of the president of Poland, Ignacy Mościcki, he moved to Poland and became the Professor of Metallurgy and Metal Research at the Chemistry Department of the Warsaw University of Technology.

After the war, he was stripped of his professorship by the communist regime due to his involvement with Germany during the war, although he was later cleared of any wrongdoing by a Polish court. He returned to his native town of Kcynia, where he ran a small cosmetics and household chemicals firm until his death in 1953.

Remembrance

As a way to commemorate him, a number of places in Poland were named after Jan Czochralski including schools and streets in such cities like Gdańsk, Poznań, Bydgoszcz and Wrocław.

In 2009, the Polish Post issued a series of four commemorative stamps. The stamp with a denomination of PLN 1,55 depicted Jan Czochralski.

In 2012, the Polish Parliament passed a resolution to name 2013 as "The Year of Jan Czochralski".

In 2016, a team of Polish mineralogists led by Łukasz Karwowski from the Silesian University and Andrzej Muszyński from the Adam Mickiewicz University named a newly-discovered mineral czochralskiit in honour of the Polish chemist. It was discovered during scientific works in the Morasko Meteorite Nature Reserve.

In 2018, a comic book by Maciej Jasiński and Jacek Michalski entitled Jan Czochralski. The Man Who Changed the World (Polish: "Jan Czochralski. Człowiek, który zmienił świat") was officially published.
 
In 2019, a commemorative IEEE Milestone plaque honouring Czochralski's scientific achievements was ceremonially unveiled at the Warsaw University of Technology.

In 2019, a square in front of the Mill of Knowledge Innovation Centre in Toruń was named in memory of Jan Czochralski.

Publications
Moderne Metallkunde in Theorie und Praxis, J. Czochralski, published by Springer, Berlin, 1924.

See also
List of Poles
Timeline of Polish science and technology

References

External links
 http://www.janczochralski.com
 https://zyciorysy.info/jan-czochralski/
 https://web.archive.org/web/20031024215816/http://www.itme.edu.pl/czochralski.htm
 http://www.tf.uni-kiel.de/matwis/amat/elmat_en/kap_6/advanced/t6_1_4.html
 https://web.archive.org/web/20160303234728/http://www.ptwk.org.pl/php/patron.php?p=eng,pa

1885 births
1953 deaths
People from Kcynia
People from the Province of Posen
Polish chemists
20th-century Polish inventors
Academic staff of the Warsaw University of Technology
Polish resistance members of World War II
20th-century chemists
Academic staff of the University of Warsaw
Technical University of Berlin alumni
Polish metallurgists